Baleares may refer to:

 The Balearic Islands - Ibiza, Palma de Mallorca and Menorca - in Spanish
 Spanish cruiser Baleares, a warship